Grist is grain that is to be ground in a mill.

Grist may also refer to:
Grist (surname)
Grist (computing)
Grist (magazine)